Cheick Sidibé is a French light heavyweight kickboxer who has been professionally competing since 1997.  He is the former two time World Boxing Council Muaythai, World Muaythai Federation, the World Muaythai Council MAD and FIBA light heavyweight champion.

Kickboxing career
Cheick Sidibe began kickboxing in 1997, but changed disciplines to muay thai in 1999. He achieved his first major honor in 2004, when he became the national class B champion. After a second place finish in 2005 class B championship, he clinched the national class A title in 2005.

In 2006, he participated, with the French Muay Thai Team, in the Amateur World Championship held in Thailand. He lost in the quarterfinals to Artem Levin.

In 2011, he once again became the national class A champion. He also went on to become the FDMA champion, after defeating Kada Boumama.

In 2012, he once again faced Artem Levin, but would once again lose, this time through a 4th round doctor stoppage.

In March 2013 Sidibe won his first world title. He won the WMF belt after defeating Marcelo Tenorio in the second round by a TKO. In September of the same year, he faced Moustapha Jamaa for the FIBA Light Heavyweight Title. He won through a 2nd round TKO.

In 2014, he faced Diogo Calado for  the WBC Muay Thai belt. He won the fight in after a second round doctor stoppage.

Championships and accomplishments

Muay Thai
Académie Française de Muay Thaï
2004 National Class C Championship
2005 National Class B Runner-up
2006 National Class A Championship
2011 National Class A Championship
Fédération de Muaythaï et Disciplines Associées
2011 FMDA Light Heavyweight Championship
World Boxing Council Muaythai
2012 WBC Light Heavyweight Runner-up
2013 WBC Light Heavyweight Championship
2014 WBC Light Heavyweight Championship
World Muaythai Federation
2013 WMF Light Heavyweight Championship
World Muaythai Council
2015 WMC MAD Light Heavyweight Championship 
FIBA
2013 FIBA Light Heavyweight Championship

Kickboxing record

|-  bgcolor=
|-  bgcolor="#FFBBBB"
| 2018-7-4|| Loss||align=left| Constantin Rusu || Tatneft Cup || Kazan, Russia || Decision (Unanimous) || 3 || 3:00|| 61-18-2
|-  bgcolor="#CCFFCC"
| 2017-9-22|| Win||align=left| Steve Wakeling || Phoenix 3 London || London, United Kingdom || TKO || 4 || 3:00|| 61-11-2
|-  bgcolor="#FFBBBB"
| 2016-11-26|| Loss||align=left| Maxim Vorovski|| NR1 Fight Show || Tallinn, Estonia || Decision (Unanimous) || 3 || 3:00|| 60-17-2
|-  bgcolor="#FFBBBB"
| 2016-9-23|| Loss||align=left| Rene Wimmer || FFC 26 || Linz, Austria || KO || 3 || 3:00|| 60-16-2
|-  bgcolor="#FFBBBB"
| 2016-7-2|| Loss||align=left| Guo Qiang || Glory of Heroes 3 || Jiyuan, China || KO || 2 || 3:00|| 60-15-2
|-  bgcolor="#CCFFCC"
| 2016-2-27|| Win||align=left| Maldin Hamzai || La Grande Soirée de la Boxe || La Riche, France || Decision (Unanimous) || 3 || 3:00|| 60-8-2
|-  bgcolor="#FFBBBB"
| 2015-12-5|| Loss||align=left| Lukas Dvorak || Gibu Fight Night 2 || Prague, Czech Republic || KO || 2 || 3:00|| 59-14-2
|-  bgcolor="#FFBBBB"
| 2015-11-7|| Loss||align=left| Ulrik Bokeme || Enfusion 33 || Delemont, Switzerland || Decision (Unanimous) || 3 || 3:00|| 59-13-2
|-  bgcolor="#FFBBBB"
| 2015-10-17|| Loss||align=left| Fang Bian || Wu Lin Feng World Championship 2015 || Zhengzhou, China || Decision (Unanimous) || 3 || 3:00|| 59-6-2
|-  bgcolor="#CCFFCC"
| 2015-3-14|| Win||align=left| Fabien Skenderaj || Grande Soirée de la Boxe || La Riche, France || TKO || 1 || 3:00|| 59-5-2
|-
! style=background:white colspan=9 |
|-
|-  bgcolor="#CCFFCC"
| 2015-2-21|| Win||align=left| Mbamba Cauwenbergh || Le Choc des Best Fighters 3 || Asnières-sur-Seine, France || Decision (Unanimous) || 3 || 3:00|| 58-5-2
|-  bgcolor="#FFBBBB"
| 2014-3-19|| Loss||align=left| Stevan Živković || Tatneft Cup || Kazan, Russia || Decision (Unanimous) || 3 || 3:00|| 58-12-2
|-  bgcolor="#FFBBBB"
| 2014-3-1|| Loss||align=left| Vladimir Idrany || Nitrianska noc bojovníkov 2014 || Nitra, Slovakia || Decision (Unanimous) || 3 || 3:00|| 58-11-2
|-  bgcolor="#CCFFCC"
| 2014-2-1|| Win||align=left| Diogo Calado || Grande Soirée de la Boxe || La Riche, France || TKO || 2 || 3:00|| 58-10-2
|-
! style=background:white colspan=9 |
|-
|-  bgcolor="#FFBBBB"
| 2013-10-5|| Loss||align=left| Marcelo Tenorio ||  Copa Brasil de Muaythai || Rio Verde, Brasil || Decision (Unanimous) || 3 || 3:00|| 57-10-2
|-  bgcolor="#CCFFCC"
| 2013-9-10|| Win||align=left| N/A ||  FIBA World Championship || Sanaa, Yemen || TKO (Injury) || 2 || 3:00|| 57-9-2
|-
! style=background:white colspan=9 |
|-
|-  bgcolor="#FFBBBB"
| 2013-4-27|| Loss||align=left| Stanislav Zanevskii ||  Tatneft Cup 2013 - 1/4 finals || Kazan, Russia || Decision (Unanimous) || 3 || 3:00|| 56-9-2
|-  bgcolor="#CCFFCC"
| 2013-3-23|| Win||align=left| Marcelo Tenorio ||  WMF World Championship || Bangkok, Thailand || TKO || 2 || 3:00|| 56-8-2
|-
! style=background:white colspan=9 |
|-
|-  bgcolor="#CCFFCC"
| 2012-11-29|| Win||align=left| Alexandros Chatzichronoglou ||  Tatneft Cup 2012 - 1/8 finals || Kazan, Russia || TKO || 4 || 3:00|| 55-8-2
|-  bgcolor="#CCFFCC"
| 2012-05-12|| Win||align=left| Jason Wilnis || It's Showtime Kortrijk/Wevelgem || Wevelgem, Belgium || Decision || 3 || 3:00||
|-
| colspan=9 | Legend:

See also
 List of male kickboxers

References 

1981 births
Living people
People from Saint-Maurice, Val-de-Marne
Sportspeople from Val-de-Marne
French kickboxers
Light heavyweight kickboxers